The Beat Goes On: The Complete Rebus Short Stories is an anthology of all the Inspector Rebus short stories (30) by Scottish crime writer Ian Rankin, plus the novella Death Is Not the End; though the Rebus short story "Well Shot" published in 2nd Culprit (1993) is not included. It is Rankin's third collection of short stories

Published in 2014, the paperback version published in 2015 includes two stories not in the hardback edition; a new story "Cinders" written for Christmas 2014 and 
an old story from his files "My Shopping Day" which was first published in "Herbert in Motion and Other Stories" (1997).

The first story "Dead and Buried" is set in the mid-1980s when Rebus was learning the ropes at Summerhall Police Station, and "The Very Last Drop" is set during a tour of a brewery immediately after Rebus’s retirement in Exit Music, a retirement present from Siobhan Clarke who goes with him (written to be read aloud at a charity night at Edinburgh’s Caledonian Brewery). "The Very Last Drop" was written to help the work of Royal Blind.

All the twelve Rebus stories in A Good Hanging and Other Stories are included: they cover a chronological year in Rebus’s life; "Playback" in March, "A Good Hanging" in August during the Festival Fringe and "Auld Lang Syne" in December. Also included are the seven Rebus stories in Beggars Banquet which has fourteen other stories, 21 in total. There are six uncollected stories from magazines and newspapers, often for a Christmas issue so set in the festive season. There are two new stories, "The Passenger" and "A Three-Pint Problem".

In the Preface (page 1) and Rankin on Rebus (pages 595-609) Rankin discusses Rebus and writing him.

Further Copyright Information (pages 610-611) gives the year of first publication as shown below and where published. Up till about 1997 they are ©Ian Rankin, then they are ©John Rebus Limited.

In the notes AGH indicates that the story was first published in A Good Hanging and Other Stories in 1992. BB indicates that the story was included in Beggars Banquet (2002), but these stories had been previously published elsewhere in magazines or newspapers.

Featured Short Stories:

References  

Works by Ian Rankin
2014 short story collections
British short story collections
Orion Books books
Detective fiction short story collections